Gaganendranath Tagore (17 September 1867 – 14 February 1938) was an Bengali painter and cartoonist of the Bengal school. Along with his brother Abanindranath Tagore, he was counted as one of the earliest modern artists in India.

Life and career
Gaganendranath Tagore was born at Jorasanko into a family whose creativity defined Bengal's cultural life. Gaganendranath was the eldest son of Gunendranath Tagore, grandson of Girindranath Tagore and a great-grandson of Prince Dwarkanath Tagore. His brother Abanindranath was a pioneer and leading exponent of the Bengal School of Art. He was a nephew of the poet Rabindranath Tagore and the paternal great-grandfather of actress Sharmila Tagore.

Gaganendranath received no formal education but trained under the watercolourist Harinarayan Bandopadhyay. In 1907, along with his brother Abanindranath, he founded the Indian Society of Oriental Art which later published the influential journal Rupam. Between 1906 and 1910, the artist studied and assimilated Japanese brush techniques and the influence of Far Eastern art into his own work, as demonstrated by his illustrations for Rabindranath Tagore's autobiography Jeevansmriti (1912). He went on to develop his own approach in his Chaitanya and Pilgrim series. Gaganendranath eventually abandoned the revivalism of the Bengal School and took up caricature. The Modern Review published many of his cartoons in 1917. From 1917 onwards, his satirical lithographs appeared in a series of books, including Play of Opposites, Realm of the Absurd and Reform Screams.

Between 1920 and 1925, Gaganendranath pioneered experiments in modernist painting. Partha Mitter describes him as "the only Indian painter before the 1940s who made use of the language and syntax of Cubism in his painting". From 1925 onwards, the artist developed a complex post-cubist style.

Gaganendranath also took a keen interest in theatre, and wrote a children's book in the manner of Lewis Carroll, Bhodor Bahadur ('Otter the Great').

Works
 Adbhut Lok: realm of the absurd, 1917, Calcutta: Vichitra Press, a portfolio of thirteen satirical pictures.
 Naba Hullod: Reform screams; a pictorial review at the close of the year 1921, 1921, Calcutta: Thacker, Spink & Co.
 Birupa bajra (Play of Opposites), 1930, Calcutta: Preonath Das Gupta for the Indian Publishing House.
 Bhondor bahadur, Kolkata: Shishu Sahitya Samsad, 1998, classic children's book

See also
Tagore family

References

Further reading
 
 Partha Mitter, The Triumph of Modernism: India’s artists and the avant-garde 1922-1947, London, 2007
  (Memoir by Gaganedranath's daughter, in Bengali)

External links

 Profile on Google Arts & Culture
 Short film by Films Division of India on YouTube
 Artworks in the collection of Victoria and Albert Museum
 Virtual tour of artworks on National Gallery of Modern Art website

Indian cartoonists
1867 births
1938 deaths
Artists from Kolkata
Indian painters
Indian artists
Indian male artists
Indian male painters
Gaganendranath
Bengali Hindus
Bengali male artists
19th-century Indian painters
19th-century Indian artists
20th-century Indian painters
20th-century Indian artists
20th-century Indian writers
20th-century Indian male writers
20th-century Bengalis
19th-century Bengalis
People from West Bengal
People from Kolkata district